Events in the year 1988 in Greece.

Incumbents
President – Christos Sartzetakis
Prime Minister of Greece – Andreas Papandreou

Births
4 March – Sophia Ralli, skier
27 June – Stefani Bismpikou, artistic gymnast
14 September – Theodora Pallidou, rhythmic gymnast
30 December – Maria Apostolidi, artistic gymnast

Deaths
17 March – Nikolas Asimos, composer and singer (born 1949)
unknown date – Angelos Lembesi, Olympic skier (born 1917)

References

 
Years of the 20th century in Greece
Greece
1980s in Greece
Greece